The Nissan LM05C is a Group C race car developed by Le Mans Garage (now Le Mans Co. , Ltd.) for the 1985 All Japan Endurance Championship (later JSPC).

Overview
The engine is equipped with Nissan's 2.3L in-line 4-cylinder turbo FJ23 type. At the same time, a car equipped with a V6- cylinder VG30 model debuted, so it was Nissan's last in-line 4-cylinder C car.

The debut race was the 1985 Fuji 500 miles (retired 0 laps). He ended up retiring in the following Suzuka 1000 km, but in WEC-JAPAN where it was raining heavily, Osamu Nakako won the 2nd prize and raised a big gold star. In the final round of the Fuji 500 km race, although he was in 8th position in the qualifying, he crashed in the final and ended up with 0 laps. This year's sponsor is the apparel company Parsons.

The following year, in 1986, the VG30 was supplied to Team Le Mans, and the LM05C was also installed and tested, but the chassis rigidity was insufficient and the VG30's power could not be received, so it was abandoned. Team Le Mans will introduce the March 86G chassis.

Although the LM05C lost the engine, it will receive a 2.1L in-line 4-cylinder turbo 4T-G type from Toyo, and Chara International will be added as a new sponsor. do. Finished 10th in the final race, Fuji 500 km.

For the 1987 season, it received a 4-valve 3S-G type , improved the rear cowl, and entered under the name of LM07/Toyota. In addition to placing 7th at the Fuji 1000 km and Suzuka 1000 km, he also placed 2nd in the Fuji 500 km qualifying run in the rain due to Nakako's hand, and also ran fast at the Fuji 500 miles in the rain. The sponsor was Apparel Best House.

Participation was limited to this year, and since then no Group C cars have been produced in the Le Mans Garage.

References

Nissan racing cars